Khaneh Miran (also Romanized as Khāneh Mīrān; also known as Khāneh-ye Amīrān and Mīrān) is a village in Sedeh Rural District, in the Central District of Arak County, Markazi Province, Iran. At the 2006 census, its population was 105, in 33 families.

References 

Populated places in Arak County